HKMO may refer to:
Hong Kong Mathematics Olympiad
ICAO-Code for Mombasa Moi International Airport